Neuquenornis volans is a species of enantiornithean birds which lived during the late Cretaceous period in today's Patagonia, Argentina. It is the only known species of the genus Neuquenornis. Its fossils were found in the Santonian Bajo de la Carpa Formation, dating from about 85-83 million years ago. This was a sizeable bird for its time, with a tarsometatarsus 46.8mm long. Informal estimates suggest that it measured nearly 30 cm (12 in) in length excluding the tail .

Etymology 
The naming means "Flying bird from Neuquén Province". Neuquenornis, from Neuquén Province + Ancient Greek ornis (όρνις) "bird". volans, Latin for "flying" in reference to the species' well-developed wing skeleton.

Description 
N. volans was described by Chiappe and Calvo in 1994. It was also mentioned in previous papers by Chiappe, but named only by its catalog number. The holotype fossil is catalogued as MUCPv-142. It is in the collection of the Museo de Ciencias Naturales, Universidad Nacional del Comahue, Neuquen, Argentina.

Phylogeny 
Chiappe and Calvo (1994) placed N. volans in the Family Avisauridae, near Avisaurus in the Enantiornithiformes. A more recent, unpublished, unreviewed, analysis that includes many newly described Enantiornithes finds it closer to Concornis and Cathayornis (or Sinornis).

The cladogram below is from Wang et al., 2015:

The cladogram below is from Wang et al., 2022:

Key to letters:

b = Boluochia
c = Cathayornis
e = Enantiophoenix
f = Houornis
h = Longipteryx
i = Parabohaiornis
j = Pterygornis
l = Vorona
m = Yuanjiawaornis
n = Yungavolucris

Paleobiology 
Long legs with hooked claws were well suited for perching as well as for пathering food on ground or shallow water.
A nesting colony has been attributed to this bird, showcasing that it display megapode-like egg burial behaviour.

References

Further reading 

  (2004a): The Theropod Database: Phylogeny of taxa. Retrieved 2013-MAR-02.

Avisaurids
Bird genera
Santonian life
Cretaceous birds of South America
Late Cretaceous animals of South America
Cretaceous Argentina
Fossils of Argentina
Bajo de la Carpa Formation
Fossil taxa described in 1994
Taxa named by Jorge O. Calvo